Nordheim is a city in DeWitt County, Texas, United States. The population was 336 at the 2020 census.

History
Nordheim was founded in 1895 when a railroad siding was extended to that point. A post office has been in operation at Nordheim since 1896.

Geography

Nordheim is located in southwestern DeWitt County at  (28.923345, –97.613449). Texas State Highway 72 forms the southern border of the city and leads northeast  to Cuero, the county seat, and southwest  to Kenedy.

Demographics

As of the 2020 United States census, there were 336 people, 200 households, and 81 families residing in the city.

As of the census of 2000, there were 323 people, 136 households, and 87 families residing in the city. The population density was 680.7 people per square mile (265.3/km). There were 170 housing units at an average density of 358.3/sq mi (139.7/km). The racial makeup of the city was 80.50% White, 1.55% Native American, 17.34% from other races, and 0.62% from two or more races. Hispanic or Latino of any race were 39.32% of the population.

There were 136 households, out of which 24.3% had children under the age of 18 living with them, 52.2% were married couples living together, 7.4% had a female householder with no husband present, and 36.0% were non-families. 32.4% of all households were made up of individuals, and 25.7% had someone living alone who was 65 years of age or older. The average household size was 2.38 and the average family size was 3.01.

In the city, the population was spread out, with 22.0% under the age of 18, 9.0% from 18 to 24, 20.4% from 25 to 44, 21.7% from 45 to 64, and 26.9% who were 65 years of age or older. The median age was 43 years. For every 100 females, there were 78.5 males. For every 100 females age 18 and over, there were 83.9 males.

The median income for a household in the city was $38,125, and the median income for a family was $43,438. Males had a median income of $30,536 versus $22,813 for females. The per capita income for the city was $14,125. About 3.2% of families and 9.8% of the population were below the poverty line, including 17.8% of those under age 18 and 11.5% of those age 65 or over.

Education
Nordheim is served by the Nordheim Independent School District.

In the media
Some of the scenes in the movie Paris, Texas were filmed at the Broadway Bar in Nordheim.

Notable people

 Santiago J. Erevia, Medal of Honor recipient; was born in Nordheim

References

Cities in Texas
Cities in DeWitt County, Texas